Dmitry Asnin (born 6 July 1984) is a Belarusian former professional footballer.

Honours
Dinamo Brest
Belarusian Cup winner: 2016–17

References

External links 
 
 
 Profile at pressball.by

1984 births
Living people
Sportspeople from Brest, Belarus
Belarusian footballers
Association football goalkeepers
Belarusian expatriate footballers
Expatriate footballers in Poland
Expatriate footballers in the Maldives
Expatriate footballers in Cambodia
FC Dynamo Brest players
FC Kommunalnik Slonim players
FC Darida Minsk Raion players
FC Slavia Mozyr players
MKP Pogoń Siedlce players
Stal Rzeszów players
FC Baranovichi players
FC Lida players
FC Khimik Svetlogorsk players
FC Naftan Novopolotsk players
FC Gomel players
Preah Khan Reach Svay Rieng FC players
FC Rukh Brest players
T.C. Sports Club players